The Bențid gas field is a natural gas field located in Șimonești, Harghita County. It was discovered in 1964 and developed by Romgaz. It began production in 1966 and produces natural gas and condensates. The total proven reserves of the Bențid gas field are around 100 billion cubic feet (2.8 km³), and production is centered on 30 million cubic feet/day (0.85×105m³).

References

Natural gas fields in Romania